Anveshitha is an Indian Telugu-language supernatural drama television series written by Ilyas - Jyotsna and directed by Ilyas Ahmed under the pseudonym Pradyumna. The serial premiered on ETV on 16 July 1997. The show ran for 100 episodes, and by the time of the telecast of its last episode on 9 June 1999. The serial was based on a paranormal novel of the same name written by the director Ilyas Ahmed. It became hugely popular among Telugu audience, winning eight Nandi Awards in different categories.

Each of its episodes lasted for about 18–24 minutes and drew in the elements of the paranormal, black magic, fantasy, horror, mystery and drama. It was produced by Ramoji Rao, the head of the Ramoji Group and the then head of ETV. The serial portrays several supernatural elements like witchcraft, black magic, the Astral world, Astral travel, demonic possessions, spirits, ghosts, working of the Ouija board, extrasensory perception, spirit guides, zombies, telepathy and Séance.

Plot 

The story revolves around a young woman named Snigdha (Yamuna) who comes to live in Hyderabad after marrying her beau Pavan (Achyuth), an archaeologist, much to the disapproval of her mother-in-law. There, certain events lead her to discover an eerily desolated monument, inside which she encounters a strange witch-cult, whose members worship a bat-like demon named Karakinkara. Strangely, the place is visible only to Snigdha and when she recounts what she saw, everyone around her starts to think she is delusional, much to her chagrin. The statue of Karakinkara seems to haunt her wherever she goes and she starts experiencing terrifying nightmares. The terror-stricken woman spends sleepless nights, and spirals into depression with no one to believe her and a not-so-loving mother-in-law.

Meanwhile, a young woman named Masthanamma (Lakshmi) is hired as a household help by Snigdha's mother-in-law. Unbeknownst to anyone, Mastanamma, who practices witchcraft, captures a terrifying paranormal entity known as Khabees and holds him captive on the top of a wardrobe as her slave. She also falls in love with Pavan and so intends to get rid of Snigdha with the help of Khabees, who starts terrifying Snigdha from above the wardrobe.

Meanwhile, Snigdha gets pregnant much to the dislike of her mother-in-law. A series of events make Mastanamma realize her mistakes and she becomes friends with Snigdha. Eventually, Snigdha gives birth to a boy named Anirudh (Master Anil Raj), whom Mastanamma saves from the attack of the Karakinkara followers. But, soon after giving birth to Aniruddh, Snigdha dies in a fire accident and Mastanamma disappears without a trace. After the death of Snigdha, a grief-stricken Pavan raises Aniruddh on his own for 7 years, before uncovering hair-raising facts and shocking truths behind Snigdha's death.

The next few episodes answer questions like was Snigdha really dead? Does her mother-in-law has anything to do with her death? Where did Mastanamma disappear to? What happened to Khabees? Who are these Karakinkara followers? Why were they after Snigdha? How does young Anirudh try to get into touch with his dead mother? Why does he start believing in the paranormal? Who is Professor Athma (Vallabhaneni Janardhan) and why does he befriend Anirudh?

The first 50 episodes revolve around the struggles of Snigdha and Pavan, while the next 50 episodes focus entirely on a grown-up Anirudh (Shanmukha Srinivas), who acquires extrasensory perception and starts remembering his past life, with the help of a spirit guide named Clara (Suma Kanakala). A few more important characters are introduced like Bheesthi Nayak (Raja), the head of the Karakinkara cult, Ankitha (Meena), Anirudh's best friend and Aneela, Anirudh's love interest. How he manages to eliminate the powerful and evil cult of Karakinkara forms the crux of the story.

Cast
 Achyuth as Pavan Kumar
 Yamuna as Snigdha Devi
 Lakshmi as Masthanamma
 Shanmukha Srinivas as Anirudh, Pavan and Snigdha's son
 Master Anil Raj as young Anirudh
 Vallabhaneni Janardhan as Professor Athma
 Suma Kanakala as Clara, spirit guide
 Raja as Bheesthi Nayak, Karakinkara cult's head
 Meena as Ankitha
 Bangalore Padma 
 Maharshi Raghava
 Ragini

Music 

The Nandi award-winning title song of Anveshitha was composed by Madhavapeddi Suresh and was sung by legendary singer K.S.Chithra.

Filming 

The filming of the serial took place predominantly at Ramoji Film City, Hyderabad, where a huge Karakinkara set was constructed.

Critical reception 

Anveshitha received critical acclaim from critics and audience alike for its unique, interesting and gripping story line. It became a favourite among children and adults alike for its horror content, with the character of 'Khabees' and the statue of Karakinkara becoming the trademarks of the serial. The performances of the lead actors, Yamuna and Achyuth received wide acclaim and the two actors became household names throughout the state.

Awards 
Nandi TV Awards (Andhra Pradesh State Film, Music, Television and Arts Awards)

References

Horror fiction
Indian horror fiction television series
Telugu-language television shows
1997 Indian television series debuts
1999 Indian television series endings
Indian television series
Indian supernatural television series
ETV Telugu original programming